The Mixopteridae are a family of eurypterids, an extinct group of chelicerate arthropods commonly known as "sea scorpions". The family is one of two families contained in the superfamily Carcinosomatoidea (along with Carcinosomatidae), which in turn is one of the superfamilies classified as part of the suborder Eurypterina.

Description
Mixopterids were characterized by large exoskeletons with scattered tubercles or semicircular scales. The prosoma (head) was subquadrate, protruding antemedially. The chelicerae (claws in front of the mouth) were small. The first two pairs of walking legs were strongly developed, with long paired spines. The third and fourth walking legs were moderately sized, with short spines. The preabdomen, the front portion of the body, was narrow with axial furrows, while the postabdomen was narrow. The telson was a curved spine.

Genera
 Order Eurypterida Burmeister, 1843
 Superfamily Carcinosomatoidea Burmeister, 1845
 Family Mixopteridae Caster & Kjellesvig-Waering, 1955
 Genus Mixopterus Ruedemann, 1921
 Genus Lanarkopterus  Størmer, 1936
Genus Terropterus Wang et al., 2021

See also

 List of eurypterids

References

Carcinosomatoidea
Silurian animals
Prehistoric arthropod families